Rebop is an American children's television series that aired from 1976 to 1979 on PBS stations and produced by WGBH Boston. The premise was to promote social understanding and diversity among young people. LeVar Burton hosted for the final season.

Quincy Jones performed the title tune You Have to Do It Yourself.

Season Overview

Season 1 (1976-1977)
Show 101 (October 9, 1976)
Show 102 (October 16, 1976)
Show 103 (October 23, 1976)
Show 104 (October 30, 1976)
Show 105 (November 6, 1976)
Show 106 (November 13, 1976)
Show 107 (November 20, 1976)
Show 108 (November 27, 1976)
Show 109 (December 4, 1976)
Show 110 (December 11, 1976)
Show 111 (December 18, 1976)
Show 112 (December 25, 1976)
Show 113 (January 1, 1977)
Show 114 (January 8, 1977)
Show 115 (January 15, 1977)
Show 116 (January 22, 1977)
Show 117 (January 29, 1977)
Show 118 (February 5, 1977)
Show 119 (February 12, 1977)
Show 120 (February 19, 1977)
Show 121 (February 26, 1977)
Show 122 (March 5, 1977)
Show 123 (March 12, 1977)
Show 124 (March 19, 1977)
Show 125 (March 26, 1977)
Show 126 (April 2, 1977)

Season 2 (1978-1979)
Show 201 (October 7, 1978) (Preview with LeVar Burton as new series host)
Show 202 (October 14, 1978)
Show 203 (October 21, 1978)
Show 204 (October 28, 1978)
Show 205 (November 4, 1978)
Show 206 (November 11, 1978)
Show 207 (November 18, 1978)
Show 208 (November 25, 1978)
Show 209 (December 2, 1978)
Show 210 (December 9, 1978)
Show 211 (December 16, 1978)
Show 212 (December 23, 1978)
Show 213 (December 30, 1978)
Show 214 (January 6, 1979)
Show 215 (January 13, 1979)
Show 216 (January 20, 1979)
Show 217 (January 27, 1979)
Show 218 (February 3, 1979)
Show 219 (February 10, 1979)
Show 220 (February 17, 1979)
Show 221 (February 24, 1979)
Show 222 (March 3, 1979)
Show 223 (March 10, 1979)
Show 224 (March 17, 1979)
Show 225 (March 24, 1979)
Show 226 (March 31, 1979)

References

External links

1970s American children's television series
1976 American television series debuts
1979 American television series endings
PBS original programming
Television series by WGBH